Trolnitrate is an organic nitrate with vasodilator activity that is used to prevent or ameliorate attacks of angina pectoris. Trolnitrate dilates the coronary vessels because of its basic action as a smooth muscle depressant, just as do nitroglycerin and other organic nitrates.

References

Nitrate esters